The 1908 Oregon Webfoots football team represented the University of Oregon in the 1908 college football season. It was the Webfoots' fifteenth season, they competed as an independent and were led by head coach Robert Forbes. They finished the season with a record of 5–2.

Schedule

References

Oregon
Oregon Ducks football seasons
Oregon Webfoots football